The Open de Divonne was a golf tournament on the Challenge Tour, held from 1993 to 1995 at Divonne-les-Bains in France, near Geneva and the border with Switzerland.

Winners

References

External links
Coverage on the Challenge Tour's official site

Former Challenge Tour events
Defunct golf tournaments in France